Anari is a 16 January 1959 Bollywood comedy film directed by Hrishikesh Mukherjee. The film stars Raj Kapoor, Nutan, Motilal and Lalita Pawar. The music was by Shankar Jaikishan and the lyrics by Hasrat Jaipuri as well as Shailendra. This was among the few movies in which Lalita Pawar played a positive role and Motilal a role with shades of grey. The film was remade in Tamil as Pasamum Nesamum and in Turkish as Enayi.

Anari was released on 16 January 1959 and met with critical acclaim. Film critics had praised the screenplay and performances of lead actors in the film. Subsequently, it became the highest-grossing film of 1959 with Box Office India declaring it "Super Hit".

Plot
Raj Kumar is an honest, handsome, and intelligent young man. Working only as a sole trader painter, he is unable to earn a living, including paying rent to his kind-hearted and talkative landlady, Mrs. D'sa. One day, Raj finds a wallet containing money and returns it to the owner, Mr. Ramnath. Ramnath admires Raj; satisfied with his honesty, he employs Raj to work in his office as a clerk. Raj meets Ramnath's maidservant Asha and they fall in love with each other. This all ends when Raj finds out that Asha is really Aarti, the niece of his employer. Unfortunately, his landlady Mrs. D'sa dies suddenly consuming medicine manufactured by Mr. Ramnath. The police conduct a post-mortem and as a result, conclude that someone poisoned Mrs. D'sa. The police take Raj for questioning as the prime suspect, is arrested, and held in jail. In the trial, however, Ramnath admits full responsibility for the tainted medicine, clearing Raj of the charges. Aarti tells Raj she promised Mrs. D'sa she would take care of him, someone who is "as big an idiot as the world is clever," giving a sense that they will marry.

Cast

Raj Kapoor as  Raj Kumar
Nutan as  Aarti Sohanlal / Asha 
Lalita Pawar as  Mrs. L. D'Sa
Shubha Khote as  Asha
Motilal as  Seth. Ramnath Sohanlal
Mukri as  Kamdaar
Nana Palsikar as  Evil Priest
Ruby Mayer as  Girl's College Facilitator
Cuckoo Moray as Aarti's friend

Soundtrack

Trivia
Motilal plays Nutan's uncle in the film. In real life, he lived with Nutan's mother, Shobhana Samarth.

In the office scene Mukri says " Aaj ka kaam Kal Karo, Kal ka kaam parson..." this dialogue was repeated by Hrishikesh Mukherjee in his 1979 movie Gol Maal.

Awards
 1959 Filmfare Best Actor Award for Raj Kapoor
 1959 Filmfare Best Music Director Award for Shankar Jaikishan
 1959 Filmfare Best Supporting Actress Award for Lalita Pawar
 1959 Filmfare Best Lyricist Award for Shailendra for "Sab Kuchh Seekha Ham Ne"
 1959 Filmfare Best Male Playback Award for Mukesh for "Sab Kuchh Seekha Ham Ne"
 1959: President's silver medal for Best Feature Film in Hindi

References

External links
 
 A study of film Anari - Indian Cinema, University of Iowa
The official tribute site for director Hrishikesh Mukherjee
Kisiki Muskurahaton Pe Ho Nisar song Lyrics

1950s Hindi-language films
1959 films
Films directed by Hrishikesh Mukherjee
Films scored by Shankar–Jaikishan
Best Hindi Feature Film National Film Award winners
Hindi films remade in other languages